Dlouhá Lhota is a municipality and village in Mladá Boleslav District in the Central Bohemian Region of the Czech Republic. It has about 500 inhabitants.

Geography
It lies in the Jičín Uplands, in a predominantly flat agricultural landscape. The Klenice River flows through the northern part of the municipal territory. The Vorlík pond is on the edge of the village.

History
The first written mention of Dlouhá Lhota is from 1383. It belonged to the Březno estate and shared its owners and destiny. Until 1416, the estate was owned by the Wartenberg family, then it was sold to Jindřich Waldstein, who soon sold it to lower nobleman Jan Lapáček. After it changed hands twice in the 15th century, it was acquired by Jindřich Hložek of Žampach. He died in 1543 and a year later, the estate was inherited by the Bubna of Litice family. They owned the estate until 1749.

Transport
Dlouhá Lhota is located on a railway of local importance leading from Mladá Boleslav to Mladějov.

Sights
There was a wooden belfry, but after it was destroyed around 1970, there are no cultural monuments in the municipality.

References

External links

Villages in Mladá Boleslav District